The Rush River, in the U.S. state of Minnesota, is a  waterway located entirely in Sibley County, although its watershed also includes parts of Nicollet and McLeod counties.  It is a tributary of the Minnesota River.

The Rush River begins at the junction of its Middle and North Branches, at approximately 94.1W longitude, and 44.5N latitude. It then flows generally to the east, with the South Branch joining it at approximately 94.0W and 44.5N.

North Branch Rush River

Middle Branch Rush River

South Branch Rush River

See also
List of rivers of Minnesota

References

Rivers of Minnesota
Rivers of Sibley County, Minnesota
Tributaries of the Minnesota River